Robert Roberts (born in Grole, Newfoundland, Canada), is a cardiologist, geneticist, speaker and educator, who is regarded as one of the founders of molecular cardiology, pioneering the genetic causes of heart disease

He is currently the chief executive officer of RDS Inc., executive director of the Heart and Vascular Institute and Director of Cardiovascular Genetics and Genomics at Dignity Health at St Joseph's Hospital & Medical Center, Chair of the International Society of Cardiovascular Translational Research at the University of Arizona College of Medicine, and a Professor of Medicine at the University of Arizona College of Medicine.

Dr. Roberts’ accomplished career as a geneticist and cardiologist also includes leading the cardiology department at Baylor College of Medicine in Houston for 23 years, serving as the President and CEO of the University of Ottawa Heart Institute, and working with NASA as a cardiology consultant where he cleared astronaut, John Glenn, to take flight into space. Dr. Roberts has been a keynote speaker in over 35 countries including the Opening Plenary Address of the American College of Cardiology, the Japanese College of Cardiology and the Australian and New Zealand Heart Association.

His research is noted for developing the first quantitative assay for MBCK, which was the standard for diagnosing heart attacks in patients for more than three decades and continues to be used in many countries.  Most of his research career was devoted to genetics and molecular biology of cardiovascular disorders  which led him to several important discoveries, including the mapping of the first gene for atrial fibrillation [1997], the first gene for Wolff-Parkinson-White Syndrome (2001) and many others. His 1998 study on arrhythmogenic right ventricular dysplasia (ARVD) among the population of Grand Falls, Newfoundland and Labrador, Canada led to the infamous Texas Vampires incident and resulted in a 5-year suspension from clinical research by Baylor's Institutional Review Board.

In 2014, he discovered the first gene for heart attacks (9p21). Dr. Roberts subsequently identified over 200 other genetic factors for increased risk of heart disease in addition to the already commonly associated environmental factors such as cholesterol and smoking which paved the way for predictive genetic testing for heart disease in men and women at any age (not just when symptomatic). He is currently evaluating the test in males and females, 40 – 60 years of age.

His current research as CEO of RDS Inc. focuses on developing a genetic test on a microchip for heart disease that scans an individual's genome for a large number of genetic risk factors associated with heart disease. An individual's polygenic risk score is calculated to identify those with an increased risk of heart attacks, in whom primary prevention can be initiated.

He served as co-editor of Hurst's The Heart for 25 years, which is the leading practitioner textbook for cardiologists while also being a member of numerous editorial boards for several journals including the current Editor-in-Chief of Current Opinion in Cardiology. For his research contributions, he has received many awards including the Distinguished Scientist of American College of Cardiology and election to the Academy of Scientists of the Royal Society of Canada. As of January 1, 2021, he has over 46,000 citations and a h-index of 105 on Google Scholar.

Education 
Dr. Roberts completed his undergraduate at Memorial University of Newfoundland. He attended Medical school at Dalhousie University and training in cardiology at University of Toronto in Canada.[1] With a scholarship from the Canadian Heart Foundation he relocated to the U.S. to complete a research fellowship at the University of California-San Diego under the mentorship of Eugene Braunwald and Burton Sobel where he contributed to the clinical trial development of TPA, a first line treatment for heart attacks. He then became Director of the Coronary Care Unit Barnes Hospital at Washington University in St. Louis (1972-1982) and was recruited by Dr. Michael DeBakey and Anthony Gotto to serve as Chief of Cardiology at Baylor College of Medicine in Houston, Texas (1982-2004), which he held for over two decades being one of the longest serving chiefs of cardiology in the US.  In 2004, he returned to Canada to become C.E.O., President and Chief Scientific Officer of the University of Ottawa Heart Institute, Ottawa, Canada (2004-2014).[2]

Clinical practice 
He was Director of the Coronary Care Unit at Barnes Hospital at Washington University in St. Louis from 1972 to 1982. He served as Chief of Cardiology at Baylor College of Medicine in Houston, Texas from 1982 to 2004, followed by President of the University of Ottawa Heart Institute, Ottawa, Canada from 2004 to 2014.

Research 
His research is noted for developing the first quantitative assay for MBCK, which was the standard for diagnosing heart attacks in patients for more than three decades. Most of his research career was devoted to genetics and molecular biology of cardiovascular disorders which led him to several important discoveries, including the first gene for atrial fibrillation in 1997, the first gene for Wolff–Parkinson–White syndrome and many others. In 2007, he discovered the first gene for heart attacks (9p21) and since as part of an International Consortium has identified over 100 genetic factors that cause an elevated risk for heart disease in addition to the already commonly associated environmental factors such as cholesterol and smoking which paves the way for predictive genetic testing for heart disease in men and women at any age (not just when symptomatic) which he is currently developing.

Texas Vampires Controversy 
In 1998, Robert Roberts led a group of researchers from Baylor College of Medicine to conduct a study on arrhythmogenic right ventricular dysplasia (ARVD) among Grand Falls, Newfoundland and Labrador, Canada populations. The group arrived at Grand Falls to collect blood samples from community members to test for biomarkers indicating genetic predispositions of this condition. The study was extremely problematic due to procedures used by Roberts to procure the samples causing significant concerns about the informed consent process of the study. Evidence from an investigation initiated by Baylor's Institutional Review Board found that the consent process was largely skipped or done through medical intimidation by Roberts and his team. Participants also were not given results of the study despite many feeling that they might have died had they not taken part.

Due to the actions of Roberts' research team, and the public outcry which denounced the group as the Texas Vampires, the Newfoundland's Health Research Ethics Authority was established as a review board "to evaluate the ethics of all genetic studies proposed for the province". The board is the arbiter of which study groups are permitted to collect genetic materials from Newfoundlanders, among other considerations in medical ethics.

Following an internal investigation of this incident by Baylor's Institutional Review Board, Robert Roberts was among three Baylor physicians suspended from clinical research for 5 years. The study also initiated a special subcommittee investigation of procedural and ethical aspects of the study led by Baylor's IRB and Ottawa Heart Institute which found protocol concerns "of a serious nature".

Awards and honours 
He has authored over 900 publications in leading scientific journals and received several awards in recognition of his scientific contributions including the Distinguished Scientist Award from the American College of Cardiology (1998), McLaughlin Medal from the Royal Society of Canada (2008), Award of Meritorious Achievement from AHA (2001), Best of What's New by Popular Science (1994), and was elected to Fellow of the Academy of Science of the Royal Society of Canada (2013).

He served as Associate Editor of Hurst's The Heart for nearly 30 years while also being a member of numerous review boards for several journals and currently remains Editor-in-Chief of Current Opinion in Cardiology, Section Editor of Genomics for JACC and Associate Editor for JACC:BTS

References 

Canadian cardiologists
Dalhousie University alumni
University of Toronto alumni
Living people
Year of birth missing (living people)